Siberian Finnish or Korlaka is the form of Finnish spoken in Siberia by the Siberian Finns. Siberian Finnish is an umbrella name, this name refers to at least two languages/dialects. 

The first language is an Lower Luga Ingrian Finnish – Lower Luga Ingrian (Izhorian) mixed language. The ancestors of the speakers of this language migrated from the Lower Luga area (more exactly Rosona river area, Yamburgsky Uyezd of the Saint Petersburg Governorate) to Siberia in 1803-1804. The academic name for this language: Siberian Ingrian Finnish (Russian: Сибирский ингерманландский идиом), native speakers call this language as follows: suomen kiel', mejjen kiel', oma kiel'. Most native speakers (at the time of 2022) of this language live in Ryzhkovo village, as well as near Ryzhkovo, in Omsk and in Tallinn (Estonia). 

The second Finnish language in Siberia is a language spoken by the descendants of exiles from the Grand Duchy of Finland and repressed people Finnish ethnic origin during the Soviet period. This language is close to standard Finnish (probably based on Eastern Finnish dialects and has borrowings from Estonian and Russian). Several native speakers of this language live in Omsk, and a few isolated native speakers of this language live in other settlements of the Omsk Region (Orlovka, probably Ivanovka and Kovalevo). 

Siberian Finnish differs depending on the background of the speaker and their education level; most speakers of Siberian Finnish are old. And the Finnish skills of the Siberian Finns are being lost.

Some speakers of Siberian Finns have lived in Ryzhkovo, Orlovka, Bugene (another name for this village is "Finy" (Russian: Фины), this village has not been inhabited since about 2010) and Ivanovka.

The History of Studying Siberian Finnish 
Vieno Zlobina suspected high influence from Siberian Estonians in Siberian Finnish, however Ruben Erik Nirvi theorized that the similar features came before going into Siberia, such as the comitative ending -kä/ka.  Estonian scientists (Juri Viikberg, Anu Korb, Aivar Jürgenson) had conducted large-scale studies on devoted to the Siberian Estonians and during these expeditions, they discovered at Finnish-speaking ethnic groups and the groups in which the Estonian and Finnish ethnic and linguistic components were in a complex interaction. Daria Sidorkevich from the Institute for Linguistic Studies of the Russian Academy of Sciences researched and documented the Siberian Ingrian Finnish language in 2008 - 2014. Ph.D. thesis about this language was written by Daria Sidorkevich in 2013-14. Siberian Ingrian Finnish was also researched and documented by Mehmet Muslimov from the Institute for Linguistic Studies of the RAS, Fedor Rozhanskiy from University of Tartu, Natalia Kuznetsova  from Università Cattolica del Sacro Cuore and Ivan Ubaleht  from Omsk State Technical University. Ruslan Haarala did a study on Siberian Finnish in 2005. Finnish speakers can still be found inside Siberia. According to Haarala it is possible to improve the situation of Siberian Finnish, because it is still being used.

Examples of Siberian Finnish 

 Tere! = hello
 saatko arvoa = do you understand
 Juttele eestis tai suomeks, daže ryssäki käyb = speak in Estonian or Finnish, well even Russian works
 gorod, linna = city
 dom, tuba = house
 otpusk = vacation
 ulitsa, tänävä = road
 elänikot = people
 saada arvoa = to understand
 kõik = all
 aek = time
 hän õppib = he learns
 lapsenka = with a child
 syntysin = I was born
 käsiinkä = with hands
 korlaka = Siberian Finn
 piam menem penssiäm pääl = I am soon retiring
 tirehtoori = director
 ded ne pomnit = uncle doesn't remember
 juure = into
 daže = even
 hevosenka = on a horse

Grammar 
Some grammatical elements in Siberian Finnish are the comitative ending ka/kä and the 3rd person singular ending -b and the imperfect ending si-.

Siberian Finnish has a large Russian influence, such as "vnuki" 'grandchild', izvenenija 'sorry' and tak praela 'right?'.

References

External links 
 Documentary about Siberian Finns with spoken Siberian Finnish
 Siberian Finnish Incubator plus
 Working Repository of Siberian Ingrian Finnish contains audio, video and annotations under a free license (CC BY)
 Siberian Ingrian Finnish Talking Dictionary 

Finnish dialects
Languages of Siberia